Krásnovce (until 1899 ) is a village and municipality in Michalovce District in the Kosice Region of eastern Slovakia.

History
In historical records the village was first mentioned in 1403.

Geography
The village lies at an altitude of 108 metres and covers an area of  (2020-06-30/-07-01).

Ethnicity
The village is 99% Slovak.

Culture
The village has a public library and a football pitch.

References

External links

https://web.archive.org/web/20080111223415/http://www.statistics.sk/mosmis/eng/run.html 
http://www.krasnovce.eu
http://krasnovce.minet.sk

Villages and municipalities in Michalovce District
Zemplín (region)